Area code 772 is a telephone area code in the North American Numbering Plan (NANP) for the Treasure Coast of the U.S. state of Florida. The numbering plan area (NPA) includes Sebastian, Fellsmere, Vero Beach, Fort Pierce, Port St. Lucie, Jensen Beach, Stuart, Hobe Sound, Indiantown, and other areas in east central Florida. The area code was created in 2002 in a split from area code 561, when the telephone number pool exhausted due in part to the increase of cell phone users.

The Treasure Coast was served by four different area codes in about a 15-year span. For 41 years the area was part of area code 305, until it became part of area code 407 in 1988. After belonging to NPA 561 since 1996, it finally split off with area code 772 in 2002.  Today, despite the Treasure Coast's rapid growth, 772 is nowhere near exhaustion; NANP projections estimate that the region will not need another area code until at least 2049.

In pop-culture, this area code is referenced in YNW Melly’s 772 Love.

See also
List of Florida area codes

External links

772
772
2002 establishments in Florida
Treasure Coast